Sayaka Mori (森 さやか, Mori Sayaka, born 29 September 1988) is a Japanese softball player. She competed in the 2020 Summer Olympics and won a gold medal.

References

1988 births
Living people
Softball players at the 2020 Summer Olympics
Japanese softball players
Olympic softball players of Japan
Olympic gold medalists for Japan
Olympic medalists in softball
Medalists at the 2020 Summer Olympics
21st-century Japanese women